Vladimir Ilyich Gundartsev (13 December 1944 – 25 November 2014) was a Soviet biathlete. At the 1968 Winter Olympics in Grenoble, he won a gold medal with the Soviet relay team, and an individual bronze medal.

Biathlon results
All results are sourced from the International Biathlon Union.

Olympic Games
2 medals (1 gold, 1 bronze)

World Championships
2 medals (1 gold, 1 bronze)

*During Olympic seasons competitions are only held for those events not included in the Olympic program.

References

External links
 

1944 births
2014 deaths
Soviet male biathletes
Biathletes at the 1968 Winter Olympics
Olympic biathletes of the Soviet Union
Medalists at the 1968 Winter Olympics
Olympic medalists in biathlon
Olympic bronze medalists for the Soviet Union
Olympic gold medalists for the Soviet Union
Biathlon World Championships medalists
Burials in Troyekurovskoye Cemetery